There are 208 Grade II* listed buildings in Tyne and Wear, England. Over a third of these are constituent parts of the Byker Wall housing estate, which is given its own sub-heading below.

Gateshead

|}

Newcastle upon Tyne

The Byker Wall development

|}

Newcastle (except Byker)

|}

North Tyneside

|}

South Tyneside

|}

Sunderland

|}

Former listed buildings

|}

Notes

References 

National Heritage List for England

External links

 
Tyne and Wear
Lists of buildings and structures in Tyne and Wear